Himmler's War is an alternate history novel written by Robert Conroy. It was published by Baen Books online as an ebook on December 1, 2011 before being published as a normal book five days later.

Plot 
About a month and a half after the start of the Normandy landings, an American bomber drops its ordnance on a random target, which just happens to contain Adolf Hitler, who is killed. With Hitler dead, Reichsführer-SS Heinrich Himmler assumes control of Nazi Germany. For the Allies, there is confusion on whether attempts should be made to negotiate with the new government, or Germany should be forced into an unconditional surrender.

References

2011 American novels
American alternate history novels
Novels by Robert Conroy
Novels set during World War III
Alternate Nazi Germany novels
Cultural depictions of Adolf Hitler
Cultural depictions of Heinrich Himmler
Baen Books books